Abrotanella patearoa is a species of flowering plant in the family Asteraceae. The species is endemic to New Zealand.

References 

patearoa